Herbert Knoblich (11 June 1939 – 5 December 2021) was a German physicist and politician. A member of the Social Democratic Party of Germany, he served as president of the Landtag of Brandenburg from 1990 to 2004.

References

1939 births
2021 deaths
People from the Province of Silesia
Members of the Landtag of Brandenburg
Social Democratic Party of Germany politicians